Nang Khin Zay Yar (born in Taunggyi on March 4, 1988) is a Burmese model, actress and beauty pageant titleholder who won Miss Universe Myanmar title in 2012. She belongs to the Pa'O ethnic group from Myanmar. She also won the Missosology's Miss International 2012 People's Choice Award, Pageantology.net Miss International 2012 People's Choice Award and Miss Internet Award in Miss International 2012, Okinawa.

Early life

Nang Khin Zay Yar was born in Taunggyi on March 4, 1988 to her mother Nang Phyu Phyu Khine and her father Khun Aung Myat. Nang Khin Zay Yar went to Basic Education High School No. 4 Taunggyi. Nang Khin Zay Yar finished her education from Taunggyi University, earning her degree as a Bachelor of Laws. After she finished her education, she opted to become a tour guide instead of a lawyer, shortly afterwards moving into model industry. She can speak both English and German.

Career

Nang Khin Zay Yar became a model in 2011, taking photos for magazines, journals and model websites. In 2012, shortly after she won the title of Miss Myanmar 2012, she was offered to shoot for some advertisements. Currently she is appearing on many Burmese videos and movies as an actress. Although she does not have a clear intention to be a singer so soon, she is already singing both in local and foreign shows and concerts.

Personal life

Nang Khin Zay Yar is single. Her religion is Buddhism. She currently lives in Yangon, Myanmar. She is still working as a tour guide, although she is already a model.

Competitions

Miss Myanmar 2012

Nang Khin Zay Yar competed in Miss Myanmar 2012 which was held on March 25, 2012 at Myanmar Convention Center (MCC), Yangon. The competition was organized by the Myanmar Tourism Services (MTS) Co., under the supervision of Myanmar Travel Board (MTB) in order to promote tourism industry in the country and enhance the interest of citizens in the tourism sector. Nann Khin Zayar won Miss Yangon title, Miss Myanmar 2012 title and she was assigned as a tourism Ambassador of Myanmar.

Miss International 2012
She won the Miss Internet Award in the Miss International 2012 competition.

References

External links

1988 births
Living people
Burmese beauty pageant winners
Burmese female models
People from Shan State
Burmese people of Shan descent
People from Taunggyi
Burmese Buddhists
Miss International 2012 delegates